The Ministry of Fisheries is the central government ministry of Sri Lanka responsible for fisheries. The ministry is responsible for formulating and implementing national policy on fisheries and aquatic resources development and other subjects which come under its purview. The current Minister of Fisheries is Douglas Devananda. The ministry's secretary is K.D.S. Ruwanchandra.

Ministers
The Minister of Fisheries is a member of the Cabinet of Sri Lanka.

Secretaries

References

External links
 

Fisheries
 
Sri Lanka
Fisheries